The Columbian Lodge No. 7 Free and Accepted Masons is a historic building constructed in 1902 in Columbus, Georgia. Its Chicago style design is by architect T. Firth Lockwood. It was listed on the National Register of Historic Places in 1980.  It has also been known as the Flowers Building.

It is a four-story Chicago school-style commercial building.

The building was deemed significant "as a turn-of-the-century Masonic Temple, which later became a major commercial center in downtown Columbus, housing offices of leading professionals and businessmen", and as "the only example of the Chicago Commercial building in town. It is Sullivanesque in the use of the tall vertical pilasters and over all upward thrust of the facades. It also shows some influence of John Wellborn Root in its Romanesque detailing, such as the granite piers on the first floor, the rounded arches on the 3rd floor, and the heavy cornice on the parapet."

The building was constructed in 1902 as meeting hall for local Masonic lodges (with commercial retail and office space rented on the floors not occupied by the Masons). The Masons sold the building to a Mr. Flowers in 1940. Under his ownership it was used as an office building. Miller & Gallman Developers later converted it into an apartment complex.

Columbian Lodge (as an organization) was chartered in 1828.

References

External links
Columbian Lodge No. 7 F&AM, 1902, Columbus, 2015 blog with photo

Buildings and structures in Columbus, Georgia
Chicago school architecture in Georgia (U.S. state)
Clubhouses on the National Register of Historic Places in Georgia (U.S. state)
Former Masonic buildings in Georgia (U.S. state)
Masonic buildings completed in 1902
National Register of Historic Places in Muscogee County, Georgia